Podbrege is a village in the municipality of Jegunovce, North Macedonia.

History
A  toponym in the village bears the name Arbina, stemming from Arban, the old South Slavic ethnoynm for Albanians, suggesting direct linguistic contact with Albanians or the former presence of an assimilated Albanian community.

Demographics
As of the 2021 census, Podbrege had 199 residents with the following ethnic composition:
Macedonians 171
Roma 11
Serbs 10
Persons for whom data are taken from administrative sources 7

According to the 2002 census, the village had a total of 179 inhabitants. Ethnic groups in the village include:

Macedonians 161
Serbs 1
Romani 16
Others 1

References

Villages in Jegunovce Municipality